Quzan (also Romanized as Qūzān and Qowzān; also known as Ghoozan, Ghūzān, and  Qozān) is a village in Jowkar Rural District, Jowkar District, Malayer County, Hamadan Province, Iran. At the 2006 census, its population was 383, in 88 families.

References 

Populated places in Malayer County